Erigeron poliospermus is a species of flowering plant in the family Asteraceae known by the common names gray-seeded fleabane and purple cushion fleabane. Native to western North America, it is mainly found in east of the Cascade Range in Washington, Oregon, and Idaho. It is a species of desert, scrub and rocky habitats below , and is occasionally found at higher elevations.

The plant generally produces only 1–3 flower heads per stem. Each head has 15–45 pink, purple, or white ray florets surrounding numerous yellow disc florets. The ray florets are lacking in var. disciformis.

Varieties
Erigeron poliospermus var. cereus Cronquist - Washington
Erigeron poliospermus var. disciformis (Cronquist) G.L.Nesom - Washington, Oregon
Erigeron poliospermus var. poliospermus - British Columbia, Washington, Idaho, Oregon

References

External links

poliospermus
Plants described in 1884
Flora of British Columbia
Flora of the Northwestern United States
Flora without expected TNC conservation status